Where the Blind Horse Sings is a book written by Kathy Stevens, the founder of Catskill Animal Sanctuary.  This book chronicles Stevens's experiences in creating one of the country's  "most successful" sanctuaries for abused and neglected farm animals.

Reception

Author
Kathy Stevens is the founder and director of Catskill Animal Sanctuary in Saugerties, NY. She left her 11-year teaching career behind in 2000 to transform a rundown farm into a haven for abused horses and farm animals. In addition to the rescue and rehabilitation of animals, Stevens has dedicated her efforts educating the public on matters of human health concerns and environmental damage associated with factory farming practices.

References
 Stevens, Kathy "Where the Blind Horse Sings". 2007, 204 pages, Skyhorse Publishing.
 Bent, Nancy "Review of Where the Blind Horse Sings". Booklist.com 2007
 Publishers Weekly "Review of Where the Blind Horse Sings". Publishersweekly.com 2007
 Amazon.com "Product Description for Where the Blind Horse Sings". Amazon.com 2007

2007 non-fiction books
American non-fiction books
Saugerties, New York
Skyhorse Publishing books